The Russulales are an order of the Agaricomycetes, (which include the agaric genera Russula and Lactarius and their polyporoid and corticioid relatives). According to the Dictionary of the Fungi (10th edition, 2008), the order consists of 12 families, 80 genera, and 1767 species. According to Species Fungorum (January 2016), the order contains 13 families, 117 genera (16 not assigned to a family), and 3,060 species.

Russuloid agarics represent an independent evolutionary line of agarics, not directly related to the Agaricales.

This group also includes a number of russuloid hypogeous fungi, polypores such as Bondarzewia, some tooth fungi (e.g. Auriscalpium vulgare), and club fungi e.g. Artomyces. Basidiospores in this group are typically ornamented with amyloid warts or reticulation but a few exceptions are known, e.g. Heterobasidion annosum. The genus Clavicorona was often treated in the Russulales, but its type species, C. taxophila, is in the Agaricales. The remaining species are retained in the Russulales in the genus Artomyces.

Genera Incertae sedis
There are several genera classified in the Russulales that are i) poorly known, ii) have not been subjected to DNA analysis, or iii) if analysed phylogenetically do not group with as yet named or identified families, and have not been assigned to a specific family (i.e., Incertae sedis with respect to familial placement). These include:
Aleurocystidiellum
Dentipellopsis
Gloeoasterostroma
Gloeohypochnicium
Gloeopeniophorella
Haloaleurodiscus
Neoalbatrellus
Polypus
Scopulodontia
Scytinostromella
Xeroceps

References

External links
 Russulales News
 The Russulales Website

 
Basidiomycota orders